Depraved is a 2019 American horror film written and directed by Larry Fessenden and starring David Call and Joshua Leonard.  It is a modern version of Mary Shelley's Frankenstein.

Plot
Suffering from PTSD following his stint as an army medic, Henry now works feverishly in his Brooklyn laboratory to forget the death he witnessed overseas by creating life in the form of a man cobbled together from body parts. After procuring a brain from an unwitting victim, his creation—Adam—is born. But it soon seems that giving life to Adam was the easy part; teaching him how to live in a dark and troubled world may be perilous.

Cast
 David Call as Henry
 Joshua Leonard as Polidori
 Alex Breaux as Adam
 Ana Kayne as Liz
 Maria Dizzia as Georgina
 Chloe Levine as Lucy
 Owen Campbell as Alex
 Addison Timlin as Shelley
 Chris O'Connor as Mr. Beaufort
 Alice Barrett as Mrs. Beaufort
 Andrew Lasky as Sam the Bartender
 Jack Fessenden as Eddie
 James Tam as Mr. Zhang
 Zilong Zee as Mr. Ling
 Noah Le Gros as Soldier Adam
 John Speredakos as Officer Spano
 Hope Blackstock as Officer Flores
 Stormi Maya as Strip Club Bartender
 Rev Love as Stripper #1
 Hannah Townsend as Stripper #2

Release
Depraved made its worldwide debut on March 20, 2019 at the IFC Center's What The Fest!? Film Festival.  On May 13 that same year, it was announced that IFC Midnight acquired American distribution rights to the film.

Reception
The site's consensus reads: "A thrillingly effective update on a classic story, Depraved jolts a familiar monster back to life with a potent blend of timely themes and old-school chills." On Metacritic, the film has a weighted average score of 69 out of 100, based on 10 critics, indicating "generally positive reviews".

David Ehrlich of IndieWire graded the film a B.  Anya Stanley of Dread Central awarded the film three stars out of five. Katie Rife of The A.V. Club awarded the film a B- and found that Fessenden did something interesting with what is "the umpteenth adaptation of a centuries-old classic."  Jeannette Catsoulis of The New York Times called it Fessenden's "most coherent and visually polished work to date" while still finding it a little "overlong." TheWrap's William Bibbiani was more critical saying "as a whole it contributes little to the “Frankenstein” tradition, other than a reminder that this has all been done before, mostly better."

References

External links
 
 

2019 films
2019 horror films
American science fiction horror films
Glass Eye Pix films
Frankenstein films
2010s English-language films
2010s American films